Fiskeville is a small village in the south west corner of Cranston, Rhode Island, United States, the south east corner of the Town of Scituate, Rhode Island and across the northern side of Coventry, Rhode Island. The village's Main Street forms the border between Cranston and Scituate. Fiskeville grew up as one of several mill towns along the Pawtuxet River in the mid-1800s. The Fiskeville textile mill was formed by Dr. Caleb Fiske, a Revolutionary War doctor turned businessman in 1812. The village became home to those who worked in the mill, mostly immigrants from Portugal, France, Italy and England. Fiskeville is usually associated with Cranston rather than with Scituate as most of the original buildings including Dr. Fiske's residence were in Cranston. Although the mill and about a dozen nearby mill houses were in Scituate. Poets Karen Haskell and Darcie Dennigan both grew up, a few doors down from each other, in the 1970s and 1980s on Main Street in Fiskeville.

References 

Cranston, Rhode Island
Scituate, Rhode Island
Villages in Providence County, Rhode Island
Villages in Rhode Island